A Molbo story is a Danish folktale about the people of Mols, who live in eastern Jutland near the town of Ebeltoft. In these tales the Molboes are portrayed as a simple folk, who act foolishly while attempting to be wise.

History
Molbohistorier (Molbo stories) were handed down by generations of  Danes before finally appearing in print. Christian Elovius Mangor, who by permission of the Danish monarch Christian VII had started a printing press in Viborg, published the first collection, Tales of the well-known Molboes' wise and brave actions, in 1771. A second edition followed in 1780. Over the years Molbo stories have been published in books for adults and children in several languages, including Danish, Norwegian and English. Similar narratives are found in other cultures. England, for instance, has "Lazy Jack"  and "The Wise Men of Gotham." In Finland there are stories about the people of Hölmölä (Hölmöläiset).

In 1898 the operetta "Molboerne" (The People of Mols) by composer Olfert Jespersen and lyricist Herman Petersen premiered in Copenhagen. The work not only had a memorable score but numerous references to such Molbo stories as “The Stork In The Corn” and “Leg-Sorting”.

Norway, which for nearly three centuries was part of the kingdom of Denmark-Norway, received many cultural influences from Denmark. Consequently, Molbo stories are known in both Denmark and Norway, and the word “Molbo” is used in both countries as a term of disparagement. The expression "Molbo politics" is prohibited when speaking from the rostrum in Norway's parliament.

The Headless Man

The Molboes have a long way to the forest so they must rise early to collect wood. One morning some of them drove to the forest to bring home a tree they had bought. But on the way the one who drove first happened to lose his axe, and when the others saw that, they thought he threw it away on purpose, so they threw away their axes as well. Now, as they stood in the forest, they had nothing with which to chop, they didn't know what to do at all, and they certainly didn't want to come home empty-handed. Finally one of them had the brilliant idea to pull the tree down; but as they hadn't brought a rope, one of them had to climb the tree and lay his head in the cleavage between two branches then the others were to pull his legs until the tree yielded. Very well, they pulled and they pulled, and eventually they all fell backwards, including the chap they had been pulling, only he had no head. This they couldn't fathom, they went searching and searching, but no, they didn't find the head, because it was stuck in the tree. Well, that couldn't be helped, now it was time to return home. And so they laid the headless man in the wagon and took him home to his wife and asked if she was sure that her husband had brought his head when he left home this morning. "I can't remember that right now!", said the wife; but then she thought for a while: "Oh yes, he did bring his head!" she said. "He ate cabbage with it this morning before he left."

See also
Chelm
Fool (stock character)
Wise Men of Gotham

References

External links
Molbohistorier 01
Molbohistorier 02
Molbohistorier 03
The Molbo Column
Hayseeds And Bumpkins
The Molboes and the Hen
Book
Molbo- og aggerbohistorier
Images
Old Stories From Denmark
Those Foolish Molboes
Streaming audio
Serenade af Molboerne
Videos
Serenade af Molboerne
Potpourri af Molboerne

Danish humour
Danish folklore
Joke cycles
Short story types